Lambadi, Labanki or Banjari is a language spoken by the once nomadic Banjara people across India and it belongs to Indo-Aryan group of languages. The language does not have a native script.

Regional dialects are divided between the Banjara of 
Maharashtra (written in Devanagari), Karnataka (written in the Kannada script), Tamil Nadu (written in the Tamil script) and Telangana, Andhra Pradesh (written in the Telugu script). Speakers are bilingual in either Telugu, Kannada, or Marathi.

References

Bibliography 
Boopathy, S. Investigation & report in: Chockalingam, K., Languages of Tamil Nadu: Lambadi: An Indo-Aryan Dialect (Census of India 1961. Tamil Nadu. Volume ix)
Trail, Ronald L. 1968. The Grammar of Lamani.

 
Western Indo-Aryan languages
Languages of Andhra Pradesh
Languages of Karnataka
Languages of Maharashtra
Languages of Rajasthan
Languages of Tamil Nadu
Languages of Telangana